WZ Cephei is an eclipsing binary star of W Ursae Majoris-type in the constellation of Cepheus, located 880 light years away from the Sun. The stars orbit around a common orbital barycenter every  0.41744 days (slightly over 10 hours). Timing analyses have revealed the possible presence of a third low-mass stellar companion in a wide orbit.

Presence of a third body

According to Zhu & Qian (2009) a third low-mass object of stellar nature could be responsible of orbital period variations observed for WZ Cep with a periodicity of roughly 32 years. Such a companion would yield a minimum mass of 0.17 Solar masses and be located 26.6 Astronomical Units (nearly the same orbital separation of Neptune in Solar System) from the eclipsing binary. The star could likely turn out a Proxima Centauri-analog, with inferred luminosity 3.7 percent that of Sun and 20 percent of its radius, according to mass-radius relationship.

References

Cepheus (constellation)
Cephei, WZ
W Ursae Majoris variables
F-type main-sequence stars